Nazir Oladayo Temitope Olajide Bakrin (born 23 October 2002) is an English professional footballer currently playing as a defender for Charlton Athletic.

Club career

Charlton Athletic
Bakrin joined Charlton Athletic from Fulham as an under-17.

Cray Wanderers (loan)
On 25 January 2022, Bakrin joined Cray Wanderers on a month's youth loan. On 25 February 2022, Bakrin's loan was extended for a further month. On 30 March 2022, it was announced that Bakrin's loan at Cray Wanderers had ended.

Career statistics
.

Notes

References

2002 births
Living people
English footballers
Association football midfielders
Fulham F.C. players
Charlton Athletic F.C. players
Cray Wanderers F.C. players